This article describes major accidents and incidents involving submarines since 2000.

2000s

2000

Kursk explosion

In August 2000, the Russian Oscar II-class submarine   sank in the Barents Sea when a leak of high-test peroxide in the forward torpedo room led to the detonation of a torpedo warhead, which in turn triggered the explosion of around half a dozen other warheads about two minutes later. This second explosion was equivalent to about 3–7 tons of TNT and was large enough to register on seismographs across Northern Europe. The explosion and the flooding by high pressure seawater killed the majority of the submarine's 118 sailors. Twenty-three survived in the stern of the submarine, but despite an international rescue effort, they died several days later either from a flash fire or suffocation due to a lack of oxygen. The Russian Navy was severely criticized in its home country by family members of the deceased crew for failure to accept international help promptly.

2001

Ehime Maru and USS Greeneville collision

The collision occurred while members of the public were on board the submarine observing an emergency surface drill.

A naval inquiry found that the accident was the result of poorly executed sonar sweeps, an ineffective periscope search by the submarine's captain, Commander Scott Waddle, bad communication among the crew and distractions caused by the presence of the 16 civilian guests aboard the submarine.

The Navy and the command of Greeneville have been criticized for making no immediate attempt to help the Japanese on Ehime Maru that survived the initial collision. Weather conditions were producing  waves and the submarine's partially surfaced condition prevented the opening of deck hatches. These were cited as reasons for the submarine captain's choosing to stand off and remain close by. While the U.S. Coast Guard directly responded, survivors resorted to automatically deployed life rafts from Ehime Maru.

2002

USS Dolphin major flooding and fire
In May 2002, the U.S. Navy research submarine  experienced severe flooding and fires off the coast of San Diego, California. The ship was abandoned by the crew and Navy civilian personnel, who were rescued by nearby naval vessels. No one was seriously injured. Although severely damaged, the boat was towed back to San Diego for overhaul.

USS Oklahoma City collision with tanker
On 13 November 2002,  collided with the Leif Hoegh liquefied natural gas tanker Norman Lady, east of the Strait of Gibraltar. No one on either vessel was hurt, and there were no leaks of oil from fuel tanks and no threat to the environment, but the submarine sustained damage to her periscope and sail area, and put into La Maddalena, Sardinia, for repairs. Her commanding officer, Commander Richard Voter, was relieved of his command on 30 November. One other officer and two enlisted crew members were also disciplined for dereliction of duty.

HMS Trafalgar

A report issued in May 2008 stated that tracing paper (used to protect navigational charts) had obscured vital data during a training exercise. Furthermore, the officer in charge of the training exercise had not been tracking the submarine's position using all the available equipment. Commanders Robert Fancy and Ian McGhie were court martialled and reprimanded over the incident.

2003

HMAS Dechaineux flooding
The high-pressure seawater flooded the lower engine room before the hose was sealed off. It was estimated that if the inflow had continued for another twenty seconds, the weight of the water would have prevented Dechaineux from returning to the surface. The Navy recalled all of the Collins-class submarines to the submarine base HMAS Stirling after this potentially catastrophic event, and after naval engineers were unable to find any flaws in the pipes that could have caused the burst, they commanded that the maximum safe depth of these submarines be reduced.

Ming 361 accident

In May 2003, China announced that the entire ship's crew (70 people) had been killed aboard the Ming-class submarine 361 due to a mechanical malfunction. The accident took place off the coast of Liaoning province in northeast China. The vessel was recovered and towed to an unidentified port, where the cause of the accident was identified. When the battery was running low, the submarine surfaced with a vent opening for oxygen, which was consumed heavily by the charging diesel engines. At the same time, a sea wave surged, and seawater started to flow into the opening vent that automatically closed to prevent flooding. There was no single device on the submarine to detect low oxygen level and the crew suffocated due to the diesel engines consuming all the oxygen present within the submarine. As a consequence, the Commander and the Political Commissar of the People's Liberation Army Navy were dismissed from service, as well as the Commander, Political Commissar and Chief of Staff of the Northern Fleet.

K-159 sinking
In August 2003, the Russian   sank in the Barents Sea. This submarine had been decommissioned, and she was being towed away for scrapping. Of her skeleton crew of ten sailors, nine were killed.

USS Hartford grounding

On 25 October 2003, the American   ran aground in the harbor of La Maddalena, Sardinia, in the Mediterranean Sea. This grounding caused about nine million dollars' worth of damage to Hartford.

2004

HMCS Chicoutimi fire
On 5 October 2004, the Canadian submarine  suffered from two fires after leaving Faslane harbour for Halifax harbour. One officer, Canadian Forces Lieutenant (Navy) Chris Saunders, died the following day while he was being flown via helicopter to a hospital in Ireland.
Canadian Forces investigators concluded that poor insulation of some power cables caused the fires. The following board of inquiry found that the fire was caused by a series of events that caused electrical arcing at cable joints from seawater penetration at the joints.

2005

USS San Francisco collision with undersea terrain
One of her sailors, Machinist mate 2nd Class (MM2(SS)) Joseph Allen Ashley, of Akron, Ohio, died from the injuries he suffered in the collision. This happened while San Francisco was on a high-speed voyage to visit Brisbane, Australia.

An additional 97 sailors were injured in this accident, including two with dislocated shoulders. The collision with the seamount was so severe that San Francisco nearly sank. Accounts from the scene related a desperate struggle for positive buoyancy after her forward ballast tanks had been ruptured. Several news web sites stated that the boat had hit an "uncharted sea mount" at a high speed. The captain of the submarine, Commander Kevin Mooney, was later relieved of his command after an investigation revealed that he had been using inadequate methods of ocean voyage planning.

San Francisco returned to her base at Guam, where emergency repairs were carried out. Next, she steamed to the Puget Sound Naval Shipyard for more permanent repairs. The bow section of San Francisco was replaced with that of her sister ship, which had already been removed from service because of years of wear and tear. This replacement of the bow of San Francisco was successful, and the vessel returned to active service in the Pacific Fleet, based at San Diego.

AS-28 emergency

Unable to free itself, the submarine was stuck with a depleting air supply.

After a multi-national effort, a Royal Navy team using a Scorpio ROV was able to free the submarine from the entanglement, allowing it to return to the surface. All seven crew members were rescued safely.

USS Philadelphia collision with MV Yasa Aysen
No injuries were reported on either vessel. The damage to the submarine was described as "superficial." The Turkish ship suffered minor damage to its hull just above her waterline, but the United States Coast Guard inspected the ship and found her to be still seaworthy. The commanding officer of Philadelphia, Commander Steven M. Oxholm, was relieved of his command following this collision.

2006

Daniil Moskovsky fire
On 6 September 2006 the Russian Victor III-class submarine Daniil Moskovsky suffered a fire which resulted in the deaths of two crewmen (a warrant officer and a sailor). At the time of the incident the submarine was anchored off the Rybachiy peninsula, on Russia's north coast near the border with Norway. The fire was extinguished with no damage to the reactor (which had been scrammed as a precaution), and the submarine was towed to a base at Vidyayevo. The incident was reported as being caused by an electrical fire in the vessel's wiring.

USS Minneapolis-Saint Paul incident
This resulted in the deaths of Senior Chief Thomas Higgins (chief of the boat) and Sonar Technician 2nd Class Michael Holtz. After the preliminary investigation, Commander Edwin Ruff received a punitive letter of reprimand, stating that the accident was avoidable, and he was reassigned to a shore-based post in Norfolk, Virginia.

2007

USS Newport News collision with Japanese tanker Mogamigawa
On 8 January 2007,  was transiting submerged in the Straits of Hormuz when she hit the Japanese tanker Mogamigawa. She had been operating as part of Carrier Strike Group 8 (CSG-8), organized around the aircraft carrier  and dispatched to the Indian Ocean to help support operations in Somalia.

HMS Tireless
On 21 March 2007 two crew members of the Royal Navy's ,  were killed in an explosion caused by air-purification equipment in the forward section of the submarine. The submarine was in service in the Arctic Ocean and had to make an emergency surface through the pack ice. A third crewmember who suffered "non-life-threatening" injuries was airlifted to a military hospital at Elmendorf Air Force Base near Anchorage, Alaska. According to the Royal Navy, the accident did not affect the ship's nuclear reactor, and the ship sustained only superficial damage.

2008

HMS Superb
The submarine was decommissioned slightly earlier than planned as a result of the damage.

Russian K-152 Nerpa gas leak

On 8 November 2008, at least 20 men died of asphyxiation from a gas leak on board the Russian nuclear submarine K-152 Nerpa, during trials in the Sea of Japan. The submarine was leased to the Indian Navy in 2011 and was formally commissioned into service as INS Chakra in 2012.

2009

HMS Vanguard and Triomphant collision

Two nuclear submarines, the Royal Navy's  and the French Navy's Triomphant, collided in February 2009. They were operating in the Atlantic Ocean at the time. No injuries or radiation leaks were reported.

USS Hartford and USS New Orleans collision

2010s

2010

HMS Astute grounding

On 22 October 2010,  ran aground on a sand bank off the coast of the Isle of Skye in Scotland.

2011

HMCS Corner Brook grounding
 ran aground in Nootka Sound off the coast of Vancouver Island on 4 June 2011, while conducting SOCT (Submarine Officer Training Course). Minor injuries were sustained by two crew members and the submarine returned to CFB Esquimalt after the incident without escort or further incident. A board of inquiry into the incident deemed commanding officer, Lieutenant-Commander Paul Sutherland, had responsibility for safe navigation of the submarine and was relieved of his command.

2012

USS Miami arson 
On 23 May 2012, during a scheduled maintenance overhaul,  suffered extensive damage from a fire, which was later determined to have been part of a series of fires started deliberately by a civilian shipyard worker who was seeking time off from work. The Navy determined it would be uneconomical to repair the submarine and decided to decommission and scrap her instead.

USS Montpelier collision with USS San Jacinto 
 and the Aegis cruiser  collided off the coast of north-eastern Florida on 13 October 2012 during an exercise while the submarine was submerged at periscope depth. There were no injuries aboard either ship. The initial assessment of damage was that there was a complete depressurization of the sonar dome aboard San Jacinto. The investigation revealed that the principal cause of the collision was human error, poor teamwork by Montpelier watch team, and the commanding officer's failure to follow established procedures for submarines operating at periscope depth. Additionally, the investigation revealed contributing factors threaded among the various command and control headquarters that provide training and operational oversight within Fleet Forces Command.

2013

INS Sindhurakshak explosion and sinking
On 14 August 2013, the Indian Navy's  Kilo-class Type 877EKM submarine sank after explosions caused by a fire took place on board when the submarine was berthed at Mumbai. The fire, followed by a series of ordnance blasts on the armed submarine, occurred shortly after midnight. The fire was put out within two hours. Due to damage from the explosions, the submarine sank at its berth with only a portion visible above the water surface. Sailors on board reportedly jumped off to safety. The vessel was salvaged later and 18 dead bodies were recovered.

Due to the explosion, the front section of the submarine was twisted, bent and crumpled, and water had entered the forward compartment. Another submarine, also sustained minor damage when the fire on Sindhurakshak caused its torpedoes to explode. An enquiry into the incident found the cause of the incident to be violation of Standard Operating Procedures during torpedo loading. This resulted in the explosion of two torpedoes during the incident while the remaining 14 torpedoes disintegrated.

The navy was hopeful of using Sindhurakshak after it was salvaged, but on Navy Day 2015, Vice Admiral Cheema confirmed the Sindhurakshak would be disposed of. After a period of use for the training of marine commandos, the submarine was sunk in 3000 metres of water in the Arabian Sea during June 2017.

Russian K-150 Tomsk fire
On 16 September 2013, fifteen seamen were hospitalized after a fire on the Oscar-class submarine. The fire started during welding activity, as the sub was being repaired at the Zvezda shipyard near Vladivostok on the Sea of Japan. The fire was put out after five hours.
A federal Investigative Committee said the fire had "caused damage to the health of 15 servicemen" and they remained in hospital. It gave no details about their condition.

USS Jacksonville collision
On 10 January 2013,  struck an unidentified vessel in the Persian Gulf and bent one of its periscopes. The ship's commanding and executive officers were relieved for cause following the incident.

The ship was later identified as a fishing trawler.

2015

HMS Talent collision
In early 2015   entered Devonport Naval base in Plymouth with significant damage to its sail after striking ice.

2016

Sinking of unknown North Korean submarine
On March 11, 2016, CNN and the U.S. Naval Institute News reported that unnamed US officials believed a North Korean submarine had been lost at sea in the Sea of Japan. According to reports, the U.S. military had been observing the submarine when it "stopped" before the North Korean navy was observed searching the area by American satellites, aircraft and ships.

HMS Ambush collision
On 20 July 2016, while operating at periscope depth on a training exercise in the Strait of Gibraltar,  collided with a merchant ship, sustaining significant damage to the top of her conning tower. The merchant vessel did not sustain any damage. It was reported that no crew members were injured during the collision and that the submarine's nuclear reactor section remained completely undamaged.

2017

UC3 Nautilus sinking
On 11 August 2017, the privately owned midget submarine  sank off the coast of Denmark. Danish authorities believe its owner Peter Madsen allegedly scuttled the submarine to hide evidence in the murder of journalist Kim Wall. In October 2017, Madsen admitted to dismembering Wall during their submarine trip and was later convicted of her murder.

ARA San Juan
On the night of 16 November 2017, the Argentine Navy submarine ARA San Juan and her crew of 44 was reported missing in the San Jorge Gulf region. Ships and long-range patrol aircraft from several nations, including Argentina, Brazil, Chile, Uruguay, Russia, the United Kingdom and the United States, were dispatched in a search and rescue mission. Rescue submersibles and parachute rescuers were deployed. On 30 November, hopes of rescuing the crew alive were abandoned.

On 16 November 2018, the company Ocean Infinity had located San Juan through a remote submersible. All 44 crew members were lost with the submarine.

2019

Losharik fire
On 1 July 2019, a fire on what it described as a Russian deep-water research submarine surveying the seabed near the Arctic killed 14 sailors. Russian officials faced accusations of trying to cover up the full details of the accident, and some Russian media criticized what they said was a lack of transparency, and drew parallels with the dearth of official information during the meltdown of a Soviet nuclear reactor in Chernobyl in 1986. One day later, the Russian government officially disclosed the incident on the submarine Losharik and acknowledged that the vessel had a nuclear reactor on board.

2020s

2020

Hoegh London collision with South Korean Navy submarine
On July 15, 2020, 05:00 UTC, Norwegian merchant ship Hoegh London (IMO 9342205) and South Korean Navy's Jang Bogo-class submarine collided near Gadeokdo island, Busan, South Korea.

2021

KRI Nanggala (402) sinking

The submarine was declared sunk on April 24, 2021, 18:00 (GMT+7) by Commander of the Indonesian National Armed Forces Hadi Tjahjanto at a depth of 700–800 meters below sea level.

Debris was found including a safety uniform, that may have been worn by the crew. The Singapore Navy RSSV ship MV Swift Rescue's ROV took the submarine's first image.

USS Connecticut (SSN-22) collision with seamount
On 2 October 2021,  was damaged after she collided with a seamount while maneuvering in the South China Sea. About eleven sailors were injured, though none were reported to be life-threatening, and the submarine's propulsion system and nuclear reactor were said to be operating normally. After an investigation, the commanding officer, his executive officer, and the chief of the boat were all relieved of duty.

References

External links
 American Society of Safety Engineers. Journal of Professional Safety. Submarine Accidents: A 60-Year Statistical Assessment. C. Tingle. Sept. 2009. Pages 31–39. Ordering full article: https://www.asse.org/professionalsafety/indexes/2009.php; or Reproduction less graphics/tables: http://www.allbusiness.com/government/government-bodies-offices-government/12939133-1.html.

Submarine accidents
21st-century maritime incidents